Horatio Colony II (1900-1977) was an American poet, playwright and businessman. He wrote a novel, Free Forester, as well as eleven books of poetry and two plays. His poetic works include Bacchus and Krishna, The Flying Ones, Young Malatesta, Antique Thorn: The Faun's Girl, Early Land: Two Narrative Poems, Some Phoenix Blood, Magic Child, and Flower Myth. He wrote the plays The Emperor and the Bee Boy and The Amazon's Hero.

Colony was born in Keene, New Hampshire, and was the grandson of the city's first mayor. His family were successful mill owners, a vocation which he inherited but had little passion for. He began writing at an early age and continued to do so until his death.

Free Forester (1935) was the most successful of his works, receiving a positive review from The New York Times, which called him "a new name in literary circles" and the novel "sensitively and intelligently made and felt".

At his death, Colony's house was transformed into the Horatio Colony House Museum at his bequest. A separate plot of land owned by his family was turned into the Horatio Colony Nature Preserve at this time as well.

References 

1900 births
1977 deaths